Marc Keahey was a Democratic member of the Alabama Senate, representing the 22nd district.

Personal life and education
Keahey earned a business degree from the University of Alabama, and in 2004 earned a JD from Cumberland School of Law. He has a wife, Karie, and four children.

Career
After graduating from law school, Keahey served as a public defender, assistant district attorney, and private lawyer. Keahey was elected to the Alabama House of Representatives in 2006, and won a special election the Alabama Senate in 2009. He won election to a full Senate term in 2010. Keahey served on the Agriculture, Conservation and Forestry Committee, Business and Labor Committee, Fiscal Responsibility and Accountability Committee, Judiciary, and the Local Legislation No. 3 Committee.

In 2010, Keahey was named Legislator of the Year by the Alabama Association of Conservation Districts.

He dropped his re-election bid in 2014 after the Republican-controlled Senate redrew his district to be majority Republican.

References

External links
Vote Smart page
Twitter account

Living people
People from Grove Hill, Alabama
University of Alabama alumni
Cumberland School of Law alumni
Alabama lawyers
Democratic Party members of the Alabama House of Representatives
Democratic Party Alabama state senators
Public defenders
1980 births